Ann Brashares (born July 30, 1967) is an American young adult novelist.  She is best known as the author of The Sisterhood of the Traveling Pants series.

Life and career
Brashares was born in Alexandria, Virginia, and grew up in Chevy Chase, Maryland, with her three brothers. She attended elementary and high school at the Sidwell Friends School in Washington, D.C. After studying philosophy at Barnard College, she worked as an editor for 17th Street Productions.  17th Street was acquired by Alloy Entertainment, and following the acquisition she worked briefly for Alloy.

After leaving Alloy she wrote The Sisterhood of the Traveling Pants (2001), which became an international best seller. It was followed with three more titles in the "Pants" series that were The Second Summer of the Sisterhood (2003), Girls in Pants: The Third Summer of the Sisterhood (2005) and Forever in Blue: The Fourth Summer of the Sisterhood (2007). The first book in the series was adapted into the film The Sisterhood of the Traveling Pants in 2005. The sequel, The Sisterhood of the Traveling Pants 2, based on the other three novels in the series was released in August 2008. Brashares' first novel for adults, The Last Summer (of You and Me) was released in 2007.  The first companion book to the Sisterhood series, 3 Willows: The Sisterhood Grows, was published in 2009, and the second companion book, Sisterhood Everlasting, was published in 2011.  Her second novel for adults, My Name is Memory was published in 2010 and has been optioned for film. Brashares' young-adult time travel novel, The Here and Now, was published in April 2014. She lives in New York City with her artist husband, Jacob Collins, and children Samuel, Nathaniel, Susannah and Isaiah.

Works
Brashares mainly writes for young adults. Besides the Sisterhood series and its two companion books, 3 Willows and Sisterhood Everlasting, she has contributed two 80-page biographies to the nonfiction book series Techies and has published two standalone novels for adults. She won the Indies Choice Book Award for Children's Literature in 2002, and won the Quill Award for Young teen/adult in 2005.

Nonfiction
2001 – Linus Torvalds, Software Rebel (Twenty-First Century Books, 2001)
2001 – Steve Jobs Thinks Different (Twenty-First Century, 2001)

Fiction
2001 – The Sisterhood of the Traveling Pants
2003 – The Second Summer of the Sisterhood
2005 – Girls in Pants: The Third Summer of the Sisterhood
2007 – Forever in Blue: The Fourth Summer of the Sisterhood
2007 – The Last Summer (of You and Me)
2009 – 3 Willows: The Sisterhood Grows
2010 – My Name Is Memory
2011 – Sisterhood Everlasting
2014 – The Here and Now (Delacorte, April 2014)
2017 – The Whole Thing Together

References

External links

 
Sisterhood Central biography
Teenreads biography
Alumna profile at Barnard College
New York Times profiles Brashares, her husband, and their renovated East Side carriage house, January 4, 2007

 

1967 births
American children's writers
American young adult novelists
Barnard College alumni
Living people
Writers from Alexandria, Virginia
People from Chevy Chase, Maryland
Novelists from Maryland
Novelists from New York (state)
American women novelists
21st-century American novelists
American women children's writers
21st-century American women writers
Women writers of young adult literature
Novelists from Virginia